{{Speciesbox
| name = Humped leek orchid
| image = 
| image_caption = 
| taxon = Prasophyllum gibbosum
| authority= R.Br.
| display_parents = 3
| synonyms=Chiloterus cucullatus <small>(Rchb.f.) D.L.Jones & M.A.Clem.</small>
}}Prasophyllum gibbosum, commonly known as the humped leek orchid, is a species of orchid endemic to the south-west of Western Australia. It is a late-flowering leek orchid with a single smooth, tubular leaf and up to eighty or more purplish-red and white flowers with a smooth labellum. It is similar to P. cucullatum but that species has a frilly labellum, usually a shorter flowering stem and an earlier flowering period.

As with others in the genus, the flowers are inverted so that the labellum is above the column rather than below it. The dorsal sepal is broad and the petals face forwards. The lateral sepals have a humped base. The labellum is mostly white, has smooth edges and is turned upwards towards the lateral sepals. Flowering occurs from late September to January.

Taxonomy and naming
The hooded leek orchid was first formally described in 1810 by Robert Brown from specimens collected near Albany. The description was published in Prodromus Florae Novae Hollandiae et Insulae Van Diemen. The specific epithet (gibbosum) is a Latin word meaning "very humped" or "crooked", referring to the hump at the base of the lateral sepals.

Distribution and habitat
The humped leek orchid  grows in areas that are wet in winter, and only flowers prolifically after fire the previous summer. It occurs from Bunbury to Esperance in the Swan Coastal Plain, Jarrah Forest and Warren biogeographic regions.

ConservationPrasophyllum gibbosum'' is classified as "not threatened" by the Western Australian Government Department of Parks and Wildlife.

References

External links 
 

gibbosum
Endemic flora of Western Australia
Endemic orchids of Australia
Plants described in 1810